Giampiero Littera (born 25 June 1938) is an Italian former film actor.

Life and career 
Born in Rome, Littera, while still a teenager, made his film debut in Luciano Emmer's High School. Four years later, after completing his high school studies, he had his breakthrough role as Benito in Mario Camerini's Vacanze a Ischia. From then Littera appeared in numerous films, often cast in the role of the cheerful, loyal friend of the protagonist. In 1970 he played his last role and then he devoted himself to a career as an antique dealer.

Selected filmography 
 Vacanze a Ischia (1957)
 Maid, Thief and Guard (1958)
 Legs of Gold (1958)
 Le signore (1960)
 The Joy of Living (1961)
 Eighteen in the Sun (1962)
 Shivers in Summer (1963) 
 The Magnificent Adventurer (1963) 
 Veneri al sole (1965) 
 Two Mafiosi Against Goldfinger (1965)
 Golden Chameleon (1967)
 The Crazy Kids of the War (1967)
 Don Franco e Don Ciccio nell'anno della contestazione (1970)

References

External links 

1938 births
Male actors from Rome
Italian male film actors
Living people
20th-century Italian male actors